The men's hammer throw event at the 2013 Summer Universiade was held on 8 July.

Medalists

Results

References 
Results

Hammer
2013